Kay (meaning "king") was a ruling title used in Iranian mythology by the Kayanians of the Avesta, later to be adopted by the Kushano-Sasanians, followed by the Sasanian monarchs of Iran.

References

Sources 
  

 

Iranian words and phrases
Royal titles
Government of the Sasanian Empire
Titles in Iran